Lucía Sánchez Saornil (1895–1970), was a Spanish poet, militant anarchist and feminist. She is best known as one of the founders (alongside Mercedes Comaposada and Amparo Poch Y Gascón) of Mujeres Libres and served in the Confederación Nacional del Trabajo (CNT) and Solidaridad Internacional Antifascista (SIA).

Biography 

Sánchez Saornil was an anarchist, particularly of the anarcho-syndicalist movement. Today she is considered to be an anarcho-feminist. However, she did not consider herself a feminist. The concept of feminism was associated with the upper-class. Therefore, working-class women who aligned themselves with the class struggle did not embrace feminism. However, many of the ideals they did embrace would be considered feminist by today's standards. Many of her peers shared this view.

Sánchez Saornil was involved with Emma Goldman, a well-known anarchist. Emma Goldman corresponded with Sánchez Saornil and assisted anarchist causes in the Mujeres Libres organization. Goldman's agenda aligned in many aspects with the agenda of Mujeres Libres.  

Sánchez Saornil met América Barroso, the woman she would spend the rest of her life with, right as Mujeres Libres was gaining significant traction. Although they faced backlash for their lesbian relationship from the state and from their communities, as well as risked putting their lives in danger, Sánchez Saornil and Barroso stuck together as they fled to Paris, returned to Madrid, and fled again to Valencia, wherein they would continue the rest of their relationship and their lives in secret.

Mujeres Libres

Mujeres Libres ("Free Women") attempted to focus on women's liberation and emancipation. Many believed that women's freedom would arise from a classless society, but Mujeres Libres disagreed. It focused on women's sexual freedom, but with some restraint. Women's sexual freedom was seen as a private individual matter, not one for the public or the state. Therefore, programs were limited. Mujeres Libres did not focus as much on lesbianism, love, or abortion, as these were less practical and more associated with the feminist movement, which Mujeres Libres distanced themselves from.

The organization worked to educate women and children. Spain still had low literacy rates in this part of the century. Mujeres Libres endeavored to educate women in order to give them power. In this education, anarchist teachings were also very present. Mujeres Libres also helped educate children, supporting schools in rural Spain, especially in Andalucía. Daycare programs were also established, helping women to balance work and family.

Mujeres Libres  instructed women on the importance of birth control. The aim was to allow women to have children when they chose to. In this era, women were often expected to work at a factory or similar job, as well as care for a household and children. Birth control allowed women to determine the direction they wanted their life to go. Mujeres Libres also held anti-prostitution drives.

Essays about sexuality and sexual liberation were generally less touched upon in Mujeres Libres. They hardly considered these topics to be important political issues on which the movement should feel compelled to craft a hard stance, despite Sánchez Saornil's identity as a lesbian woman.

Exile and hiding
With the defeat of the Second Republic, Sánchez Saornil and her partner América Barrosa were forced to flee to Paris, where Sánchez Saornil continued her involvement in the SIA. With the fall of France to Nazi forces, it was soon necessary for them to move again and they returned to Madrid in 1941 or 1942. Her exile and return are still somewhat mysterious.

Writing 

Sánchez Saornil wrote under the male pen name Luciano de San Saor. Her poetry revolved around themes of lesbian desire during a time (i.e., Francoist Spain) in which portrayals of queerness were heavily policed. She also wrote poems about industrialism, religion, marriage, anarchism, and economic revolution. Some of these poems include "Sensual Twilight," "Suburban Landscape," "Sunday," "Landscape in Memory," "To Sarah, Dead, who Desperately Cried Out to God," and "Romance of Durruti." She also wrote essays like "The Question of Feminism" and "The Women Question in our Media," followed by "A Summary on the Woman Question: For Compañero Vázquez," wherein she first developed her rationale for co-creating Mujeres Libres, both the journal and the organization. One of her more scathing essays, "The Marriage Ceremony or Spiritual Cowardice," delineates her critiques of marriage as a contract of sale.

See also
 Anarcha-feminism
 
 Anarchism in Spain

References

Bibliography 

 Ackelsberg, Martha A. Free Women of Spain: Anarchism and the Struggle for the Emancipation of Women. Bloomington, IN: Indiana University Press, 1991.
 Cimbalo, Michela. Ho sempre detto noi. Lucía Sánchez Saornil, femminista e anarchica nella Spagna della Guerra Civile. Roma, Viella, 2020.
 Enders and Radcliff. Constructing Spanish womanhood: female identity in modern Spain. SUNY Press, 1999.
 Linhard, Tabea Alexa. Fearless women in the Mexican Revolution and the Spanish Civil War. University of Missouri Press, 2005.
 Nash, Mary. Defying Male Civilization: Women in the Spanish Civil War. Denver, CO.: Arden Press, 1995.
 Lucía Sánchez Saornil: La vanguardista. El Mundo (10 May 1998)
 Gimeno, Luz Sanfeliu. Lucía Sánchez Saornil; una vida y una obra alternativas a la sociedad de su tiempo. 
"The Question of Feminism" by Lucia Sanchez Saornil

1895 births
1970 deaths
Mujeres Libres
Anarcha-feminists
Anarcho-syndicalists
Libertarian socialists
Spanish anarchists
Spanish anti-fascists
Spanish feminists
Spanish feminist writers
Lesbian poets
Spanish LGBT rights activists
Spanish LGBT poets
Spanish lesbian writers
People from Madrid
Spanish women poets
20th-century Spanish women writers
20th-century Spanish poets
LGBT history in Spain
Spanish women of the Spanish Civil War (Republican faction)
Lesbian trade unionists